Thomas J. Runfola (April 12, 1907 – March 1980) was an American politician who served in the New York State Assembly from Erie's 1st district from 1951 to 1958.

References

1907 births
1980 deaths
Republican Party members of the New York State Assembly
20th-century American politicians